With the Dead are an English doom metal supergroup founded in 2014 by Tim Bagshaw, Mark Greening (ex-Electric Wizard, Ramesses) and Lee Dorrian (ex-Cathedral, ex-Napalm Death).

History
After disbanding Cathedral, Lee Dorrian joined the former members of Electric Wizard and Ramesses (Tim Bagshaw and Mark Greening) to form a new doom metal band.

The band made its existence known in August 2015, and released its eponymous debut album on 16 October 2015 to the label Rise Above Records.

In January 2016, due to a disagreement with Dorrian, Greening was dismissed, and replaced by Alex Thomas (ex-Bolt Thrower). The former bass player of Cathedral and Firebird, Leo Smee, is also part of the band. Because of the parallel activities of its members, the band gives little concerts. In 2016, however, they play at Roadburn Festival, Hellfest, and Copenhell and are also scheduled at Tuska Open Air and Loud Park Festival. On 22 September 2017 the band released their second album Love from With the Dead.

Members
Current members
 Lee Dorian – vocals (2014–present)
 Tim Bagshaw – guitars (2014–present), bass (2014–2016)
 Leo Smee – bass (2016–present)
 Alex Thomas – drums (2016–present)

Past members
 Mark Greening – drums, percussion (2014–2016)

With the Dead

With the Dead

With the Dead is the debut studio album by the English doom metal supergroup With the Dead, released on 16 October 2015.

Japanese bonus track

Love from With the Dead

Love from With the Dead

Love from With the Dead is the second studio album by the English doom metal supergroup With the Dead, released on 22 September 2017. At 65:51, It is their longest studio album and includes their longest song, the 17-minute "CV1".

Vessel of Solitude

"Vessel of Solitude"

"Vessel of Solitude" is the first single from the doom metal supergroup With the Dead that was previously unreleased and recorded during the Love from With the Dead sessions. At 2:32, is their shortest song ever recorded and is mainly oriented towards a more faster, heavy metal sound.

Single-sided

Anemia

"Anemia"

"Anemia" is the second single from the supergroup With the Dead, from their second album Love from With the Dead.

Single-sided

References

English doom metal musical groups